João Barbosa (born 11 March 1975 in Porto, Portugal) is a Portuguese auto racing driver. He currently competes in the IMSA WeatherTech SportsCar Championship for Sean Creech Motorsport in the LMP3 class. Before the 2021 Six Hours of the Glen, Barbosa's teammate, Lance Willey, left Sean Creech Motorsport, forfeiting their entry in the race.

He was runner-up in the GTS class of the Grand-Am Rolex Sports Car Series in 2003 and fifth in the DP class in 2008, accumulating a total of seven overall victories. Barbosa won the 2010 and 2014, and was third in 2009 and 2011 and fourth in 2007 and 2013. Also resulted fourth in the 2007 24 Hours of Le Mans and 2012 12 Hours of Sebring.

Career

Early years
He began racing in karts and was the Portuguese kart racing champion for the 1988 and 1989 seasons.  In 1994 he won the Portuguese Formula Ford championship; in 1995 he won the Italian Formula Alfa Boxster championship. In 1995 he won the Italian Formula Europa Boxer title, and in 1996 was runner up in the Italian Formula 3. Barbosa moved to the United States in 1997, where he was seventh in the 1997 Formula Atlantic.

Mosler (1999–2003)
In 1999 he contested two rounds in the United States Road Racing Championship with a Mosler Intruder official achieving victory at Lime Rock Park, and the Homestead's race of FIA GT Championship. In 2000 he participated in the first two races of the American Le Mans Series with a Colucci's Porsche 911. In 2001 he returned to run with Mosler three races of the Grand-Am Rolex Sports Car Series, achieving a third place in the GT class at the 6 Hours of Watkins Glen.

Barbosa continued as Mosler's driver in 2002 Grand-Am series season. He earn a win and three second places in ten races, and finished fourth in the drivers' championship in the GT class. In 2003 he ran eight rounds with a GTS class' Molser, and two in a Ford Mustang in the same class. He earned three wins, and seven podiums, resulting runner-up championship. That same year, he completed in the 1000 km Spa and the 24 Hours of Spa with Mosler, achieving a class victory in the first of them.

Rollcentre and Brumos (2004–2009)
Barbosa completed eight of twelve Rolex Sports Car Series rounds with a Maserati 2004 in the GT class. Scored two third places and was placed 16th in the championship. Moreover, drives a Dallara SP1 of Rollcentre Racing in the LMP1 class: came fifth in the 12 Hours of Sebring, retired in the 24 Hours of Le Mans, and earned a fifth place and a sixth in the four races of the Le Mans Series. Finally, disputed the Hockenheim race of the FIA GT Championship and Petit Le Mans ALMS in a Saleen S7.

In 2005, the Portuguese continued driving a Rollcentre Dallara in the LMP1 class.  He abandoned at the 12 Hours of Sebring, and achieved two third places and a fifth in the five races of the Le Mans Series. Meanwhile, he completed three rounds of the Grand-Am series with a Maserati, placing fifth in Mont-Tremblant race with Jeff Segal. Barbosa completed four rounds of the Le Mans Series 2006 with Rollcentre, now driving a Radical SR9 LMP2, obtaining a third class in the 1000 km Nürburgring as best result. Meanwhile, he finished fifth in his class at the 24 Hours of Le Mans, although dozens of laps down. In the 1000 km of Spa he drove a Perrier's Porsch 911, being sixth in the GT2 class. Also, raced the FIA GT Championship Hungaroring race in a Saleen S7. He also ran two rounds of the Grand-Am series, now in the Daytona Prototype class. 
Barbosa continued with Rollcentre in the 2007 season. At the wheel of a Pescarolo 01 LMP1 class, resulted third place overall in the 1000 km of Silverstone and fourth at the 1000 km of Valencia with Stuart Hall, which was placed eighth in the drivers' championship and fourth in the team. In turn, was fourth in the 24 Hours of Le Mans, counting as third driver a Martin Short. That same year, he came in fourth the 24 Hours of Daytona Grand-Am series and arrived late in the 6 Hours of Watkins Glen, in both cases with the Brumos Riley-Porsche.

The Portuguese returned to contest the 2008 Rolex Sports Car Series season, competing with Brumos Racing. Accompanied by JC France, he was fourth in five opportunities with a Riley-Porsche. Thus, he placed fifth in the drivers' championship in Daytona Prototype class, behind Scott Pruett / Memo Rojas and Jon Fogarty / Alex Gurney. In Europe, he continued as Rollcentre driver with whom he raced in the 24 Hours of Le Mans and four races of the Le Mans Series with a Pescarolo 01. In 2009, Barbosa continued in the Rolex Sports Car Series with JC France for Brumos Racing. They won in Homestead, were third in the 24 Hours of Daytona and fifth at Mid-Ohio, and being 16th in the drivers' championship. In Europe, he completed three endurance races with a Pescarolo 01 official with Bruce Jouanny, earning a sixth overall place in the 1000 km de Catalunya and an eighth in the 24 Hours of Le Mans, counting as third driver Christophe Tinseau.

Action Express (2010–2019) 
Action Express Racing hired Barbosa to contest the 2010 Rolex Sports Car Series season with a Riley-Porsche DP chassis with Terry Borcheller. He won the 24 Hours of Daytona, counting as additional drivers  Ryan Dalziel and Mike Rockenfeller. He was fourth at Lime Rock and tenth in five races and finishing 20th in the final placement. On the other hand, he completed two endurances races of the American LeMans Series with Extreme Speed Ferrari F430, being sixth in the GT2 class at the 12 Hours of Sebring. 
Barbosa returned to have as co-driver of JC France in the Action Express in the Rolex Sports Car Series in 2011. He won at Virginia, with Terry Borcheller as third driver, and was third in the 24 Hours of Daytona, with Christian Fittipaldi and Max Papis as additional drivers. With five top 5s in 12 races, he placed ninth in the drivers' championship in the DP class.

Moreover, the Portuguese also competed in five races of the Intercontinental Le Mans Cup with Level 5 with Scott Tucker and Christophe Bouchut. He managed sixth place overall and first in the LMP2 class at Petit Le Mans, and was third in the LMP2 class at the 24 Hours of Le Mans and the 6 Hours of Imola. 
In 2012, Action Express started to use the new Chevrolet Corvette DP in the Grand-Am series. Barbosa scored two wins in Detroit and the 6 Hours of Watkins Glen, and had six top 5s with Darren Law, culminating ninth in the drivers' championship. Meanwhile, he raced in the 12 Hours of Sebring ALMS with Level 5. He resulted fourth place overall and first in the ALMS P2-class, although behind a World Endurance Championship LMP2 car.

The Portuguese completed in the 2013 Grand-Am series with Action Express, counting as co-driver  Christian Fittipaldi in most races. He won the 6 Hours of Watkins Glen and Mid-Ohio, second in Detroit and Road America and fourth in the 24 Hours of Daytona and Kansas. He finished tenth in the drivers' championship DP class. Barbosa remained with Fittipaldi in the Action Express team in the 2014 United SportsCar Championship season, formed from the merger of the Grand-Am and ALMS series. He won the 24 Hours of Daytona, counting as additional driver  Sébastien Bourdais.

In 2015, also with Action Express Team, finished in second in 24 Hours of Daytona and won the 12 Hours of Sebring (with his teammates Fittipaldi and Bourdais).

Racing record

24 Hours of Daytona results

24 Hours of Le Mans results

WeatherTech SportsCar Championship results
(key)(Races in bold indicate pole position, Results are overall/class)

*

References

External links

Living people
1975 births
Sportspeople from Porto
Portuguese racing drivers
24 Hours of Le Mans drivers
24 Hours of Daytona drivers
FIA GT Championship drivers
WeatherTech SportsCar Championship drivers
Rolex Sports Car Series drivers
American Le Mans Series drivers
European Le Mans Series drivers
Atlantic Championship drivers
Italian Formula Three Championship drivers
24 Hours of Spa drivers
12 Hours of Sebring drivers
Extreme Speed Motorsports drivers
Action Express Racing drivers
JDC Motorsports drivers
Level 5 Motorsports drivers
Pescarolo Sport drivers